Hank Edwards (born May 2, 1983) is a professional Canadian and Arena football wide receiver who is currently a free agent. He was originally signed by the Tampa Bay Storm as a street free agent in 2006. He played college football at Texas Southern.

Edwards also played for the Toronto Argonauts

External links
Toronto Argonauts bio

1983 births
Living people
Players of American football from Florida
American players of Canadian football
Texas Southern Tigers football players
American football wide receivers
Canadian football wide receivers
Tampa Bay Storm players
Toronto Argonauts players
San Jose SaberCats players
Jacksonville Sharks players
Spokane Shock players